Seeing may refer to:

 Visual perception
 Astronomical seeing, the blurring effects of air turbulence in the atmosphere
 In the occult seeing refers to "the sight" or the ability to see auras or to predict the future; see fortune-telling
 Seeing (novel), the English title of José Saramago's 2004 novel Ensaio sobre a Lucidez
 "Seeing", a song on the Moby Grape album Moby Grape '69
 Seeing (composition), 1998 piano concerto by Christopher Rouse

See also
 See (disambiguation)
 Seeing I (novel)